Zamani Saul (born 7 March 1972) is a South African politician who is the 5th and current Premier of the Northern Cape and a Member of the Northern Cape Provincial Legislature. He has also been serving as the Provincial Chairperson of the African National Congress (ANC) since his election on 12 May 2017. He previously served as the Provincial Secretary and as the Deputy Provincial Secretary of the party.

Life and education
Zamani Saul completed his Grade 12 at Umso High School in Colesberg. He obtained a master's degree in Development Studies from the University of the Free State and a Master of Laws degree from the University of the Western Cape. He, later on, also achieved a Doctorate of Laws degree in Public Law and Jurisprudence from the same university. Saul is currently studying towards a Doctorate of Philosophy in Multi-Disciplinary Studies through the University of South Africa. He is married to Tapsy Saul, and they have children together. Their one son matriculated in 2018.

Political career
Saul served as the municipal manager of the Pixley ka Seme District Municipality from 2000 to 2008. He served as ANC Deputy Provincial Secretary from 2004 until his election as Provincial Secretary in 2008. He won re-election to a second term in 2012.

On 12 May 2017, Saul was elected unopposed as the Provincial Chairperson of the African National Congress in the Northern Cape after Premier Sylvia Lucas had withdrawn her nomination for the position. Saul succeeded John Block, who had resigned from the position in October 2015. Deshi Ngxanga succeeded Saul as Provincial Secretary.

Saul is seen as someone who is aligned with the Ramaphosa faction of the African National Congress, as he endorsed Cyril Ramaphosa to become ANC President in 2017. 
On 8 May 2019, the ANC retained their majority in the Northern Cape Provincial Legislature. Saul was selected as the party's premier candidate on 13 May 2019. He assumed the office on 22 May 2019. In his first few months, he pledged to cut what he called "wastage" from the Northern Cape government; citing as Premier he would get a bowl of fresh fruit every morning and that his car would be replaced after 120,000 km while ambulances in the province would run at 952,000+km. Accordingly he banned Northern Cape ministers from getting new cars and used the money to buy 63 new ambulances instead.

References

External links
People's Assembly profile
Zamani Saul, Dr – South African Government
Profile: Dr Zamani Saul – Northern Cape Government
Profile: Dr Zamani Saul – NCPLEG
Dr Zamani Saul: The Northern Cape's new 'activist premier'

|-

Living people
University of the Western Cape alumni
University of the Free State alumni
Premiers of the Northern Cape
People from the Northern Cape
African National Congress politicians
South African politicians
21st-century South African politicians
University of South Africa alumni
Members of the Northern Cape Provincial Legislature
1972 births